Émilie Loit and Katarina Srebotnik were the defending champions, but none competed this year.

Janette Husárová and Michaëlla Krajicek won the title by defeating Lucie Hradecká and Renata Voráčová 4–6, 6–4, 6–4 in the final.

Seeds

Draw

Draw

References

External links
 Official results archive (ITF)
 Official results archive (WTA)

Tippmix Budapest Grand Prix - Doubles
Budapest Grand Prix